Glenognatha is a genus of long-jawed orb-weavers that was first described by Eugène Louis Simon in 1887. It was considerably revised in 2016.

Species
 it contains thirty-six species, found in North America, Central America, Asia, South America, the Caribbean, Africa, on the French Polynesian Islands, and Saint Helena:
Glenognatha argenteoguttata (Berland, 1935) – Marquesas Is.
Glenognatha argyrostilba (O. Pickard-Cambridge, 1876) – Ivory Coast, Cameroon, Niger, Congo, Egypt, Ethiopia. Introduced to Caribbean, Ecuador (mainland, Galapagos Is.), Brazil, St. Helena
Glenognatha australis (Keyserling, 1883) – Ecuador to Argentina
Glenognatha boraceia Cabra-García & Brescovit, 2016 – Brazil
Glenognatha caaguara Cabra-García & Brescovit, 2016 – Brazil
Glenognatha camisea Cabra-García & Brescovit, 2016 – Peru
Glenognatha caparu Cabra-García & Brescovit, 2016 – Colombia, Venezuela, Suriname, Peru, Brazil, Bolivia
Glenognatha caporiaccoi Platnick, 1993 – Guyana
Glenognatha chamberlini (Berland, 1942) – French Polynesia (Austral Is.)
Glenognatha dentata (Zhu & Wen, 1978) – China, India, Bangladesh, Myanmar, Vietnam, Philippines
Glenognatha emertoni Simon, 1887 (type) – USA
Glenognatha florezi Cabra-García & Brescovit, 2016 – Colombia
Glenognatha foxi (McCook, 1894) – Canada to Panama
Glenognatha ganeshi (Bodkhe, Manthen & Tanikawa, 2014) — India
Glenognatha gaujoni Simon, 1895 – Ecuador, Colombia, Venezuela, Peru, Brazil
Glenognatha globosa (Petrunkevitch, 1925) – Panama, Colombia, Venezuela
Glenognatha gloriae (Petrunkevitch, 1930) – Puerto Rico
Glenognatha gouldi Cabra-García & Brescovit, 2016 – USA, Mexico
Glenognatha heleios Hormiga, 1990 – USA
Glenognatha hirsutissima (Berland, 1935) – Marquesas Is.
Glenognatha iviei Levi, 1980 – USA
Glenognatha januari Cabra-García & Brescovit, 2016 – Brazil
Glenognatha lacteovittata (Mello-Leitão, 1944) – Ecuador, Peru, Brazil, Argentina, Paraguay, Uruguay
Glenognatha ledouxi Dierkens, 2016 – French Polynesia (Society Is.: Tahiti)
Glenognatha mendezi Cabra-García & Brescovit, 2016 – Costa Rica, Colombia, Ecuador
Glenognatha minuta Banks, 1898 – Mexico, Guatemala, Costa Rica, Panama, Cuba, Dominican Rep.
Glenognatha nigromaculata (Berland, 1933) – Marquesas Is.
Glenognatha osawai Baba & Tanikawa, 2018 – Japan
Glenognatha paullula Sankaran, Caleb & Sebastian, 2020 — India
Glenognatha patriceae Cabra-García & Brescovit, 2016 – Colombia
Glenognatha phalangiops (Berland, 1942) – French Polynesia (Austral Is.)
Glenognatha smilodon Bosmans & Bosselaers, 1994 – Cameroon
Glenognatha spherella Chamberlin & Ivie, 1936 – Mexico to Peru
Glenognatha tangi (Zhu, Song & Zhang, 2003) – China, Myanmar
Glenognatha timbira Cabra-García & Brescovit, 2016 – Brazil
Glenognatha vivianae Cabra-García & Brescovit, 2016 – Brazil

In synonymy:
G. atlantica (Holm, 1969) = Glenognatha argyrostilba (O. Pickard-Cambridge, 1876)
G. centralis Chamberlin, 1925 = Glenognatha minuta Banks, 1898
G. hawigtenera (Barrion & Litsinger, 1995) = Glenognatha dentata (Zhu & Wen, 1978)
G. maelfaiti Baert, 1987 = Glenognatha argyrostilba (O. Pickard-Cambridge, 1876)
G. mira Bryant, 1945 = Glenognatha argyrostilba (O. Pickard-Cambridge, 1876)
G. montana (Simon, 1897) = Glenognatha argyrostilba (O. Pickard-Cambridge, 1876)

See also
 List of Tetragnathidae species

References

Araneomorphae genera
Pantropical spiders
Tetragnathidae